Charles Lapointe,  (born July 17, 1944) is a Canadian businessman and former politician and public servant.

Lapointe was first elected to the House of Commons of Canada in the 1974 federal election as a Liberal Member of Parliament for Charlevoix. He served as Canadian delegate to the United Nations General Assembly in 1976, and parliamentary secretary to the Transport minister from 1977 to 1979.

He was re-elected in the 1979 federal election that defeated the Liberal government. When the Liberals returned to power in the 1980 election, Lapointe was appointed by Prime Minister Trudeau to the cabinet as Minister of State for Small Businesses and Tourism.

In 1982, he became Minister of State for External Relations and, in 1983, he was promoted to Minister of Supply and Services and Receiver-General.

When John Turner succeeded Trudeau as Liberal leader and prime minister in June 1984, he retained Lapointe as Minister of Supply and Services while giving him the additional portfolio of Minister of Public Works. The added responsibility was short-lived, however, as both the Liberal government and Lapointe were defeated in the subsequent fall federal election.

Returning to private life, Lapointe became president of International Aeroplane Company, and then vice-president of business development for Lavalin. In 1989, he became president and chief executive officer of the Greater Montreal Convention and Tourism Bureau (Tourisme Montréal), retaining the position until his retirement in 2013. In 2002, he also became chairman of the Canadian Tourism Commission.

In January 2007, as head of Tourism Montreal, he said the city was filthy and more should be done to make it tidy for visitors, leading Mayor Gérald Tremblay to ask for his resignation. Supported by many, Lapointe did not resign and continued in his current position.

Lapointe was openly gay among his caucus colleagues, but never publicly spoke about his sexuality to the media, during his time in Parliament. With Tourisme Montréal, however, beginning in 1994 he created a then-innovative campaign to increase the city's visibility as a gay tourism destination, building civic partnerships with LGBT community events such as Divers/Cité and the Black and Blue Festival, and culminating in the city's hosting of the World Outgames in 2006. In 2013 he received the Hanns Ebensten Hall of Fame Award from the International Gay and Lesbian Travel Association.

References

External links
 

1944 births
Living people
Liberal Party of Canada MPs
Members of the House of Commons of Canada from Quebec
Members of the King's Privy Council for Canada
Canadian LGBT Members of Parliament
Gay politicians
People from Côte-Nord
Members of the 23rd Canadian Ministry
21st-century Canadian LGBT people
Canadian gay men